Palcamayo is a small town about 30 kilometers from Tarma, a city in Junín Region, Perú. Although it is not as big as Tarma, it is an attractive destination for tourists. There are a number of caves near to the town, and the area is designated as a National Area. The population is less than 5,350 people, as of the 2005 census.

Raising Trout Numbers and Global Warming
In 2006, a construction was built for the purpose of raising trout numbers in the area's lakes. This was to attract larger numbers of tourists to the town who come to eat the trout. There is a problem in which global warming is now affecting the lakes.

Gruta de Guagapo
The most famous cave is the Gruta de Guagapo, one of Peru's largest caves. It was discovered by the Polish expedition group, called Wysokogorski, and further exploration was carried out by the French group, AIXOIS. The full extent of the cave remains to be explored. In the local language, Guagapo means 'the cavern that cries'. This name was given because of the continuous leakages of water, drop by drop, crossing the calcareous material of the Rapasmarka Hill. There is a town, San Pedro de Cajas, which is best known for its skilled artisans at tapestry making.

Other
In Palcamayo, there is also Cocon Lake and the local cultures before the Incas, for example Qullapata, Yaumanpata, Murallapunta and Chuqimarka, which are as ancient as Cuzco.

Populated places in the Junín Region